Laguna Limpia  is a village and municipality in Chaco Province in northern Argentina.

History 
The village was developed due to the construction of the railroad in the area. The first families started to populate the area, mainly families of the railroad construction workers or their management staff.

It owes its name to the existence of a lake nearby, known for the clarity of its water. This made the first people who arrived to build the train station to call it "the station where the clear lake is", which in time was shortened to "Laguna Limpia" (Clear Lake). 

The village was officially formed on 4 September 1944.

Population 

Roads and connections 
The main road connecting the town is Provincial Route 30 (unpaved), connecting to the north with Provincial Route 3 (then to Presidencia Roca and Pampa del Indio), and to the south to Ciervo Petiso and Colonias Unidas. The other Provincial road is Provincial Route 42, connecting to the southeast to the village of Las Garcitas.

References 

Populated places in Chaco Province